is a Japanese professional shogi player ranked 7-dan.

Early life
Abe was born in Hirosaki, Aomori Prefecture on October 25, 1994. He learned how to play shogi from his father when he was five years old. As an elementary school student, Abe was interested in both Go and shogi. He was a big fan of the manga series Hikaru no Go and actually wanted to become a Go professional, but switched his focus to shogi after finding Go too difficult to learn. He started attending a formal shogi class at local department store when he was a fourth grade elementary school student, and won the 5th  in 2006 as a sixth-grader. Later that same year, he was accepted into the Japan Shogi Association's apprentice school as a student of shogi professional Osamu Nakamura at the rank of 6-kyū.

Abe advanced through the apprentice school fairly smoothly, being promoted to the rank of 1-dan in 2008, and then to 3-dan in 2009. He obtained full professional status and the rank of 4-dan after tying for first place in the 48th 3-dan League (October 2010March 2011) in 2011 with a record of 13 wins and 5 losses.

Shogi professional
In 2013, Abe was one of five shogi professionals selected to play against five computer shogi programs in the 2nd Denōsen exhibition match . Abe defeated the computer program  in the first game of the match, which turned out to be the only victory scored by the shogi professionals.

In October 2014, Abe defeated Yūki Sasaki to 2 games to 1 to win the 45th  tournament.

Promotion history
Abe's promotion history is as follows.
 6-kyū: September 2006
 3-dan: April 2009
 4-dan: April 1, 2011
 5-dan: November 4, 2014
 6-dan: November 5, 2015
 7-dan: January 28, 2022

Titles and other championships
Abe has yet to appear in a major title match, but he has won one non-major title championship.

References

External links
ShogiHub: Professional Player Info· Abe, Koru

Japanese shogi players
Living people
Professional shogi players
Professional shogi players from Aomori Prefecture
1994 births
People from Hirosaki
Shinjin-Ō